"Brother" is a song by the American heavy metal band Saul. It was released on January 25, 2019, on their debut album Rise as Equals as the lead single.

Charts

References

2019 songs
2019 singles
American heavy metal songs
Saul (band) songs